"Entre el mar y una estrella" (English: "Between the Sea and a Star") is a pop song written by Marco Flores and recorded by Thalía. It was released as the first single from her studio album Arrasando and became the first number-one single for the singer at the Billboard Hot Latin Tracks chart. 

The song was later selected as the Best Latin Hit from 2000 on Billboard.

Music video
The video for Entre el mar y una estrella was directed by Simon Brand. The music video cost 250,000 dollars to be done.

Single
 Entre el mar y una estrella (Album Version) - 3:43

Single CD + Interview

 Entre el mar y una estrella (Album Version) - 3:43
 Entre el mar y una estrella (Pablo Flores Miami Mix) - 10:50
 Entre el mar y una estrella (Pablo Flores Miami Mix Radio Edit) - 4:12
 Entre el mar y una estrella (Pablo Flores Dub) - 8:50
ENTREVISTA:
. Saludo general (Inicio de la entrevista) - 00:04
. Cuál es la diferencia entre Thalía, de Amor a la mexicana y Thalía de hoy (Arrasando) - 00:20
. Si tuvieras que definir la personalidad de este nuevo álbum, ¿cuál sería? - 00:08
. Tu reto para este disco - 00:24
. Cuál es tu sueño en la vida - 00:17
. Arrasando!! ¿Por qué este título? - 00:39
. Despedida de la entrevista - 00:15
. Saludo general - 00:04
. Saludo para el Día de la Madre - 00:04
. Saludo para el Día del Padre - 00:04
. Saludo para el Día del Niño - 00:04
. Felicitación aniversario de la Emisora - 00:05
. Presentación del Single - 00:05

Chart performance

Weekly charts

Year-end charts

See also
 List of number-one Billboard Hot Latin Tracks of 2000
 List of number-one Billboard Hot Latin Pop Airplay of 2000
 List of number-one Billboard Latin Tropical Airplay of 2000

References

External links
Entre el mar y una estrella (Video) YouTube
Entre el mar y una estrella (Banda Version) YouTube

Thalía songs
2000 singles
Spanish-language songs
Pop ballads
Song recordings produced by Emilio Estefan
Music videos directed by Simon Brand
EMI Latin singles
Songs written by Marco Flores (songwriter)